Goldfield Historic District is a historic district located in the center of Goldfield, Esmeralda County, Nevada, United States.

Description
The district encompasses  of the unincorporated community of Goldfield and is roughly bounded by 5th Street and Miner, Spring, Crystal and Elliott avenues. The district contains nearly 120 buildings, most dating from the time of Goldfield's initial boom, 1904 to 1909. Goldfield became a regional and national center of attention during Nevada's twentieth century mining boom, comparable to the Great Comstock era in the previous century.

On June 14, 1982, the district was listed on the National Register of Historic Places.

Contributing properties
Contributing properties in the district include:
 Goldfield High School
 Goldfield Hotel
 Esmeralda County Courthouse
 Southern Nevada Consolidated Telephone-Telegraph Company Building

See also

 National Register of Historic Places listings in Esmeralda County, Nevada

References

External links

Goldfield, Nevada
History of Esmeralda County, Nevada
Historic districts on the National Register of Historic Places in Nevada
Buildings and structures in Esmeralda County, Nevada
Geography of Esmeralda County, Nevada
Nevada State Register of Historic Places
National Register of Historic Places in Esmeralda County, Nevada
Populated places on the National Register of Historic Places in Nevada